Dennis Hickey is the assistant director of player personnel for the New York Giants. He was previously a senior college scout for the Buffalo Bills & former general manager of the Miami Dolphins of the National Football League (NFL).

Early life and early career

In 1990, Hickey failed to procure a football scholarship at the University of Tulsa. Hickey instead played football for Coffeyville Community College, where he led the team to a junior college football championship.

Eventually however, Hickey finally caught on with Tulsa, playing safety for the team for 3 seasons. In 1991 Tulsa finished the season 10-2.

Career

NFL career 

Prior to being hired by Miami, Hickey worked in the Tampa Bay Buccaneers football operations group, serving in a number of personnel roles.  He worked under general managers Rich McKay, Bruce Allen and Mark Dominik and alongside head coaches Tony Dungy, Jon Gruden, Raheem Morris and Greg Schiano.

On January 27, 2014, Hickey was hired by the Dolphins as their new GM. One of his first changes upon being hired by the Dolphins was the development of a football analytics department. He was fired on January 2, 2016. 

On May 19, 2017, Hickey was hired by the Buffalo Bills as a senior college scout.

On May 9, 2022, it was announced Hickey was leaving the Bills to 
join the New York Giants as an assistant director of player personnel. He reunites with Joe Schoen, who worked with Hickey as a director of player personnel & assistant general manager in
Miami & Buffalo, respectively.

References

Living people
Tampa Bay Buccaneers executives
Miami Dolphins executives
Tulsa Golden Hurricane football players
National Football League general managers
1970 births